The 2021 FA Trophy Final was a football match played on 22 May 2021. It was the final match of the 2020–21 FA Trophy, the 52nd season of the FA Trophy.

Hornchurch’s season in the Isthmian League Premier Division was suspended in November 2020 due to the COVID-19 pandemic and they were unable to play any league football. During this time they were financially supported by West Ham United chairman, David Sullivan who once lived in Hornchurch. It was played between Hereford and Hornchurch and resulted in a 3-1 win by Hornchurch, their maiden FA Trophy.

Route to the Final

Hereford

Hornchurch

Match

Details

References

Notes

FA Trophy Finals
FA Trophy Final
FA Trophy Final
Events at Wembley Stadium
FA Trophy Final
FA Trophy Final 2021
FA Trophy Final 2021